Czakó or Cakó is a Hungarian language surname, which is derived from the name for a type of military cap. It may refer to:

Ferenc Cakó (born 1950), Hungarian artist
György Czakó (born 1933), Hungarian figure skater
Hito Çako (1923–1975), Albanian politician
Iosif Czako (1906–1966), Romanian football player
Jacqueline Cako (born 1991), American tennis player
Kálmán Czakó (1919–1985) Hungarian prosecutor and politician
Krisztina Czakó (born 1978), Hungarian figure skater
László Czakó (born 1966), Hungarian gastroenterologist
Pirro Çako (born 1965), Albanian singer
Zsigmond Czakó (1820–1847), Hungarian actor and writer

See also 
Shako

Hungarian-language surnames